The Helsinki Olympic Stadium, located in the Töölö district about  from the centre of the Finnish capital Helsinki, is the largest stadium in the country, nowadays mainly used for hosting sports events and big concerts. The stadium is best known for being the centre of activities in the 1952 Summer Olympics. During those games, it hosted athletics, equestrian show jumping, and the football finals.

The stadium was also the venue for the first Bandy World Championship in 1957, the first and 10th World Athletics Championships, in 1983 and 2005. It hosted the European Athletics Championships in 1971, 1994 and 2012. It is also the home stadium of the Finland national football team.

The stadium reopened in August 2020 after 4 years of renovation.

History

The Olympic Stadium was designed by the architects Yrjö Lindegren and Toivo Jäntti. The Olympic stadium, known as an icon of functionalist style of architecture, was featured in the Architectural Digest as one of the best examples of Olympic architecture. Yrjö Lindgren later became himself an Olympic medallist when he received the gold medal for architecture at the 1948 Olympics in London.

Construction of the Olympic Stadium began in 1934 and it was completed in 1938, with the intent to host the 1940 Summer Olympics, which were moved from Tokyo to Helsinki before being cancelled due to World War II. It hosted the 1952 Summer Olympics over a decade later instead. The stadium was also to be the main venue for the cancelled 1943 Workers' Summer Olympiad.

It was the venue for the first ever Bandy World Championship in 1957.

The stadium was completely modernized in 1990–1994 and also renovated just before the 2005 World Championships in Athletics.

In 2006, an American TV series, The Amazing Race 10, had one of its episodes ending at The Olympic Stadium Tower. As a task, teams had to do a face-first rappel (known as the Angel Dive) down the Helsinki Olympic Tower.

Since March 2007, a Eurasian eagle-owl has been spotted living in and around the stadium. On June 6, 2007, during a Euro 2008 qualifying match, the owl delayed play by ten minutes after perching on a goalpost. The owl was later christened Bubi and was named as Helsinki's Resident of the Year.

The 50th anniversary of the Helsinki Olympic Games hosted in the Helsinki Olympic Stadium was the main motif for one of the first Finnish euro silver commemorative coins, the 50th anniversary of the Helsinki Olympic Games commemorative coin, minted in 2002. On the reverse, a view of the Helsinki Olympic Stadium can be seen.  On the right, the 500 markka commemorative coin minted in 1952 celebrating the occasion is depicted.

Features

The stadium's spectator capacity was at its maximum during the 1952 Summer Olympics with over 70,000 spectator places. Nowadays the stadium has 36,251 spectator places. During concerts, depending on the size of the stage, the capacity is 45,000–50,000.

A youth hostel is located within the Stadium complex.

Recent

Major renovation work at the stadium started in the spring of 2016. During renovation all the spectator stands were covered with canopies and the field area and the tracks were renewed. The stadium now also offers extended restaurant areas and more indoor sport venues. The renovation was completed and the stadium was open to the public in September 2020.

The projected cost of the renovation was expected to consume €197 million in 2016,  €261 million in 2019 and ended up at a price of €337 million, which is €140 million (or 70 percent) more than the original projected cost. The Finnish state and the City of Helsinki are the funders of the renovation.

Events

Sport events
 1952 Summer Olympics
 1957 Bandy World Championship
 1971 European Athletics Championships
 1983 World Championships in Athletics
 1994 European Athletics Championships
 2005 World Championships in Athletics
 UEFA Women's Euro 2009 (4 Group matches and a Final)
 2012 European Athletics Championships
 2022 UEFA Super Cup

Concerts

References

External links

1952 Summer Olympics official report. pp. 44–7.
Stadion.fi – Official site
History of the stadium 
Panoramic virtual tour from the stadium tower

Olympic stadiums
Olympic athletics venues
Olympic equestrian venues
Olympic football venues
Football venues in Finland
Athletics (track and field) venues in Finland
Bandy venues in Finland
Sports venues in Helsinki
Tourist attractions in Helsinki
Towers in Finland
Finland national football team
Finland
Venues of the 1952 Summer Olympics
Functionalist architecture
Modernist architecture in Finland
Yrjö Lindegren buildings
American football venues in Finland
1938 establishments in Finland
Sports venues completed in 1938
Töölö
UEFA Women's Championship final stadiums